Volodymyr Kulyk (born in Chernihiv, October 1, 1969) is a retired Ukrainian football player and coach. He spend most of his career to Desna Chernihiv the main club in Chernihiv.

Playing career
Born in Sumy, Volodymyr Kulyk became interested with football when he was in the city school's third grade studying in Lokhvytsia, Poltava Oblast where his family moved earlier. When he was in the eighth grade, to Lokhvytsia arrived Leonid Lytvynenko from Brezhnev (today Naberezhnye Chelny) and offered him to drop playing a table tennis and concentrate in football. Since 16 years of age Kulyk participated in football competitions of Poltava Oblast. After serving in the military, he settled in Chernihiv and offered to join the local team.

Volodymyr Kulyk started his professional career in Desna Chernihiv playing in the 1993–94 Ukrainian First League season, but his first season was not a successful as the team relegated. (in 2018 interview to FC Desna he was sure it took place in 1993) His first game at professional level became an away game against Spartak Okhtyrka as part of the 1993–94 Ukrainian Cup on 1 August 1993. In the season 1996–97 with the club won the Ukrainian Second League. Kulyk noted that one of the reasons why the club had a winning season was the fact that it was led by Yukhym Shkolnykov. Nonetheless, Kulyk instead of continuing playing at higher tier moved to the neighboring FC Fakel Varva where he believed he could get more playing time. In 1998 Fakel relegated to amateur competitions.

During the 2000–01 season, while playing for Elektron Romny, Kulyk was offered a good contract from Desna which at that time was led by Yuriy Hruznov. Because of it, Kulyk even went on a conflict with his former head coach of Elektron Oleksandr Kvasha and for which later regretted. Upon return to Desna, Kulyk expected to get an apartment which originally was offered to him in contract, but it never happened. More to it, after the first half of 2001–02 season at some training session he received an injury, after which Desna gave Kulyk some money for operation and let him go. Volodymyr Kulyk had couple of surgeries and retired due to injury.

Coaching career
In 2003–2010 Kulyk began his new career at the Yunist Chernihiv sports school. In 2011 he was invited to try out at women's football as an assistant coach of Serhiy Sapronov in Lehenda Chernihiv. From 2011 until almost 2018 he stayed with Lehenda Chernihiv. In 2011, he managed to bring the team second in the Ukrainian Women's League and also in 2015. In 2018 due to poor financing Lehenda-ShVSM Chernihiv was merged with the recently formed Yednist Plysky women's club, therefore Ivan Bubys who previously was coaching Desna invited Kulyk to coach at the Skala Stryi youth academy as its under-15 boys team coach. In 2019 he become the coach of Yednist-ShVSM Plysky.

Honours
As player
Desna Chernihiv
 Ukrainian Second League: 1996–97

As coach
Lehenda Chernihiv
 Ukrainian Women's League: Runner Up 2011, 2015

References

1969 births
Living people
Sportspeople from Sumy
Ukrainian footballers
FC Yunist Chernihiv managers
FC Yunist ShVSM managers
FC Desna Chernihiv players
WFC Lehenda-ShVSM Chernihiv managers
FC Elektron Romny players
FC Naftovyk-Ukrnafta Okhtyrka players
FC Fakel Varva players
FC Slavutych players
Female association football managers
Association footballers not categorized by position